Liptena submacula, the Lathy's liptena, is a butterfly in the family Lycaenidae. It is found in Sierra Leone, Liberia, Ivory Coast, Ghana and Nigeria. The habitat consists of forests.

Subspecies
 L. s. submacula (southern Nigeria)
 L. s. liberiana Stempffer, Bennett & May, 1974 (Sierra Leone, Liberia, Ivory Coast)
 L. s. maesseni Stempffer, Bennett & May, 1974 (Ghana: Volta Region)
 L. s. tringa Stempffer, Bennett & May, 1974 (eastern Ivory Coast, Ghana: Ashanti)

References

Butterflies described in 1903
Liptena
Butterflies of Africa